6-phosphofructo-2-kinase/fructose-2,6-biphosphatase 2 is an enzyme that in humans is encoded by the PFKFB2 gene.

The protein encoded by this gene is involved in both the synthesis and degradation of fructose-2,6-bisphosphate, a regulatory molecule that controls glycolysis in eukaryotes. The encoded protein has a 6-phosphofructo-2-kinase activity that catalyzes the synthesis of fructose-2,6-bisphosphate, and a fructose-2,6-biphosphatase activity that catalyzes the degradation of fructose-2,6-bisphosphate. This protein regulates fructose-2,6-bisphosphate levels in the heart, while a related enzyme encoded by a different gene regulates fructose-2,6-bisphosphate levels in the liver and muscle. This enzyme functions as a homodimer. Two transcript variants encoding two different isoforms have been found for this gene.

Interactions
PFKFB2 has been shown to interact with YWHAQ.

References

Further reading